Bessemer and Lake Erie Railroad No. 643 is the sole survivor of the class H-1 2-10-4 "Texas type" steam locomotives built by the Baldwin Locomotive Works in 1944 for the Bessemer and Lake Erie Railroad, primarily used for hauling heavy mainline freight trains in Pennsylvania and Ohio, until retirement in 1952. It is now owned privately by the Age of Steam Roundhouse Museum in Sugarcreek, Ohio, which purchased No. 643 in 2019, and is currently in the process of being moved to Sugarcreek piece-by-piece from McKees Rocks, Pennsylvania.

History

Revenue Service 
Between 1929 and 1944, the Bessemer and Lake Erie Railroad, a class II company connecting Conneaut, Erie, and Bessemer, ordered a fleet of 47 H-1 class 2-10-4 "Texas" types, which were nearly direct copies of the Chicago, Burlington and Quincy's own fleet of 2-10-4 "Colorado" types, from the American Locomotive Company in Schenectady, New York, and the Baldwin Locomotive Works in Philadelphia, Pennsylvania. The H-1 class was divided into seven subclasses: A single H-1a No. 601 in 1929, nine H-1bs Numbers 602-610 in 1930, ten H-1cs Numbers 611-620 in 1936, ten H-1ds Numbers 621-630 in 1937, five H-1es Numbers 631-635 in 1941, two H-1fs Numbers 636 and 637 in 1942, and ten H-1gs Numbers 638-647 in 1943 and 1944. No. 643 was among the H-1gs built in 1944. The design varied little between subclasses with the exception of weight; the singular H-1a and H-1bs weighed 502,630 pounds, the H-1cs weighed 519,840 pounds, the H-1ds weighed 520,000 pounds, the H-1es weighed 519,740 pounds, the H-1fs weighed 524,382 pounds and the Class H-1gs weighed 523,600 pounds. 

With a total tractive force of 102,106 pounds (or 115,206 pounds with boosters cut in), a boiler pressure of 250 pounds per square inch, and an average weight of over 500,000 pounds, these were some of the largest and most powerful non-articulated steam locomotives ever built. The H-1 series was right at home on the B&LE, hauling trains of iron ore from docks along Lake Erie at Conneaut and Erie to just outside the steel mills in Bessemer, and massive coal drags back to the lakefront from Southwest Pennsylvania.

In 1951, the B&LE decided to sell eighteen of their H-1s to the Duluth, Missabe and Iron Range Railway. These H-1s were reclassified as E-4s, E-5s, E-6s, and E-7s, and they were renumbered 700-717; No. 643, however, remained on the B&LE with the rest of the class. At this time, diesel locomotives were gradually usurping steam as the primary motive power for many North American railroads, and around the time of the sale of several of the railroad's 2-10-4s, the B&LE made the decision to dieselize its roster. Although capable and comparatively modern examples of steam power, all the H-1s had completed their last revenue freight assignments and had their fires dropped for the final time by the end of 1952. By the end of the decade, almost all locomotives of this particular design were sold for scrap, including all the CB&Q's Colorado types and all the DM&IR's 2-10-4s.

Preservation 
Despite early dieselization, the B&LE decided to spare two of their steam locomotives from scrapping, No. 643 and 2-8-0 "Consolidation" No. 154. For safekeeping, the B&LE stored their steam locomotives inside their roundhouse in Greenville, Pennsylvania with the intention of donating the locomotives to separate museums for future preservation. By the early 1980s, the B&LE had decided the time was right to auction off Numbers 154 and 643. Steamtown, U.S.A., which was still based in Bellows Falls, Vermont at the time, started bidding on No. 643 with the intent of moving it to Bellows Falls for static display, and eventually move it along with the rest of the collection to Scranton. The organization, however, was outbid by a man by the name of Glenn Campbell, who intended to restore No. 643 to operating condition. Campbell would move the locomotive to the old Union Railroad shop in Hall in 1983 for storage until he would be able to purchase the former B&LE shops in McKees Rocks.

In 1993, No. 643 was finally moved to McKees Rocks, where restoration work would begin. At one point, No. 643 was moved under compressed air to test its movement and running gear, and the locomotive was also test-fired to determine steaming capabilities. By the late 1990s, although restoration work was completed, No. 643 never ran on the main line. Although more than capable of pulling long trains, the locomotive's long, rigid wheelbase and weight necessitated relatively straight and sturdy rails to operate on - similar problems had marked the excursion career of another 2-10-4, Texas and Pacific 610.  Since 1999, Few lines could accommodate, or were willing to accommodate, such a massive locomotive in excursion service. No. 643 remained in storage inside the shops awaiting  an uncertain future, with further doubt cast after the McKees Rocks yard was isolated from live rail by CSX. In 2006, a snow storm caused cracks to form in the beams of the shop, forcing the movement of No. 643  outside before a potential collapse, and from that point on, No. 643 would be exposed to the weather, elements, and vandals while being put up for sale online for a high price. The locomotive, with such a high asking price attached, continued to sit in McKees Rocks without a buyer for several years.

In the spring of 2019, however, Campbell decreased the price to $375,000 on EBay, with the added publicity that the locomotive was at risk of being scrapped. In the months following, a willing buyer came forth. On August 5, 2019, the Age of Steam Roundhouse purchased No. 643 as an addition to their own collection of steam locomotives in Sugarcreek, Ohio. The acquisition was in tribute to the museum's late founder, Jerry Joe Jacobson, who nicknamed 643 “The King” and had long sought to add the locomotive to his roster. With the McKees Rocks yard still land locked, No. 643 would have to be disassembled to be moved by truck. As of 2023, this disassembly and movement is ongoing. No. 643's boiler has been separated from the frame and running gear, and the tender and appliances such as the headlight have already made their way to Sugarcreek. With its acquisition, No. 643 has beaten Nickel Plate Road 2-8-4 No. 763 as the overall largest locomotive in Age of Steam's collection.

Historical significance 
No. 643 is the sole survivor of the H-1 series of 2-10-4's of the BL&E, and one of two surviving B&LE steam locomotives. It ranks among the heaviest and most powerful non-articulated steam locomotives to operate, and one of the largest surviving steam locomotives in preservation in the United States. 643 is also one of only two 2-10-4's to be restored to operating condition after retirement, the other being the aforementioned T&P 610.

See also 

 Texas and Pacific 610
 Grand Trunk Western 6325
 Southern Pacific 5021
 Union Pacific 9000 Class

References

External links 
Age of Steam Roundhouse official website
2-10-4 locomotives
Railway locomotives introduced in 1944
Standard gauge steam locomotives
Preserved steam locomotives
Standard gauge locomotives of the United States
Individual locomotives of the United States
Baldwin locomotives
Preserved steam locomotives of Ohio